Saturday (Czech: Sobota) is a 1945 Czechoslovakian drama film directed by Václav Wasserman and starring Hana Vítová, Adina Mandlová and Jiřina Štěpničková.

Cast
 Hana Vítová as Helena Málková  
 Adina Mandlová as Luisa Herbertová  
 Jiřina Štěpničková as Karla Bartosová  
 Růžena Šlemrová as Herbert's mother  
 Paula Valenska as Seller  
 Ella Sárková as John's wife  
 Oldřich Nový as Richard Herbert  
 Ladislav Boháč as Jirí Vales 
 František Hanus as Petr Málek  
 Bedřich Veverka as Jindrich  
 Karel Dostal as Dr. John  
 Jindřich Láznička as Hotel doorkeeper 
 Jan Fifka as Guest  
 Marie Geblerova as Chambermaid  
 Marie Hrdlicková as Cycler  
 Slávka Jägrová as Customer  
 Bohdan Lachman as Usher  
 Kvetoslava Pouchlá 
 Jiřina Salačová as Singer 
 Jan W. Speerger as Hotel headmaster  
 Nora Stallich as Josef  
 Milos Subrt as Gardener

References

Bibliography 
 Alfred Krautz. International Directory of Cinematographers Set and Costume Designers in Film: Czechoslovakia. Saur, 1991.

External links 
 

1945 films
1945 drama films
Czechoslovak drama films
1940s Czech-language films
Czechoslovak black-and-white films
1940s Czech films